The Kennet River, now commonly spelt Kennett River, is a perennial river of the Corangamite catchment, located in the Otways region of the Australian state of Victoria.

Location and features
From its highest point, the river descends  over its  course.

Etymology
The river was named by surveyor George Smythe after the River Kennet in Berkshire, England.

See also

References

External links

 

Corangamite catchment
Rivers of Barwon South West (region)
Otway Ranges